The electoral district of Wendouree is an electoral district of the Victorian Legislative Assembly in Australia. It was created in the redistribution of electoral boundaries in 2013, and came into effect at the 2014 state election.

It largely covers the area of the abolished district of Ballarat West, covering north, southwest and west suburbs of Ballarat, including Wendouree, Alfredton, Delacombe, Redan, Ballarat North, Invermay, Black Hill and Brown Hill, as well as much of the CBD. The south suburb of Sebastopol was moved to the adjoining district of Buninyong.

The abolished seat of Ballarat West was held by Labor MP Sharon Knight. While the redistribution made Wendouree notionally Liberal-held, Knight won the new seat with a swing to Labor.

In the 2021 boundary redistribution, Wendouree gained the suburb of Sebastopol while losing the suburbs of Brown Hill and Ballarat East, with the new boundaries being based on the Western Freeway with the district of Ripon and the Yarrowee River with the district of Eureka.

Members

Election results

External links
 District profile from the Victorian Electoral Commission

References

Wendouree, Electoral district of
Ballarat